The 1904 Stetson Hatters football team represented the private Stetson College in the sport of American football during the 1904 college football season. Stetson lost the first game of the season to Jacksonville in a "stupid game."

Schedule

References

Stetson
Stetson Hatters football seasons
Stetson Hatters football